Xylophanes haxairei is a moth of the  family Sphingidae. It is known from French Guiana and Venezuela.

The length of the forewings is 37–38 mm. It is most similar to Xylophanes dolius but larger and with a markedly different pattern. The antennae are short, only reaching the forewing discal spot. The forewing outer margin is also similar to that of Xylophanes dolius but more convex, and more excavate below the apex, making the apex conspicuously falcate. The tegula are brown, with a pale brown outer edge and a median stripe. The dorsum of the thorax is pale brown, widening posteriorly, continuing subdorsally along the abdomen as a pair of pale brown stripes. The median dorsal line is very narrow, brown and bordered by two thin pale brown lines. The forewing upperside is as Xylophanes dolius but darker, the discal spot is smaller, the darker dashes immediately distal to it are diffused into a cloud and the orange suffusion between the fourth and fifth postmedian lines almost reaches the inner margin. The basal third of the forewing underside is dark brown and overlain with orange hairs. There is a dark brown or black band arising from the midpoint of the inner margin, curving across the wing distal to the discal spot and running to the apex where it fuses with the dark brown lunule on the outer margin. The area below this band is orange irrorated with dark brown. Some parts of the outer margin and the inner margin are yellow. The hindwing upperside is dark brown and the median band is dark orange, of even width and with evenly curved (though slightly blurred) edges.

Adults are probably on wing year-round.

The larvae possibly feed on Psychotria panamensis, Psychotria nervosa and Pavonia guanacastensis.

References

haxairei
Moths described in 1985